St John's Church is a ruined church and kirkyard in the parish of Gamrie, Aberdeenshire, Scotland. A church existed since the 12th century, with the current remains dating from the 16th and 18th century. The church was dedicated to St John the Evangelist.

References
Groome, Francis H. Ordnance Gazetteer of Scotland (1882-4).

Churches in Aberdeenshire